Cyrtodactylus sadleiri, also known commonly as Sadleir's bow-fingered gecko and the Christmas Island forest gecko, is a species of lizard in the family Gekkonidae. The species is endemic to Christmas Island, Australia.

Etymology
The specific name, sadleiri, is in honour of "Dr. R. Sadleir".

Habitat

Reproduction
C. sadleiri is oviparous.

See also 

 List of reptiles of Christmas Island

References

Further reading
Cogger HG (2014). Reptiles and Amphibians of Australia, Seventh Edition. Clayton, Victoria Australia: CSIRO Publishing. xxx + 1,033 pp. .
Rösler H (2000). "Kommentierte Liste der rezent, subrezent und fossil bekannten Geckotaxa (Reptilia: Gekkonomorpha)". Gekkota 2: 28–153. (Cyrtodactylus sadleiri, p. 67). (in German). 
Wells RW, Wellington CR (1985). "A Classification of the Amphibia and Reptilia of Australia". Australian Journal of Herpetology, Supplemental Series (1): 1–61. (Cyrtodactylus sadleiri, new species, p. 11).
Wilson S, Swan G (2013). A Complete Guide to Reptiles of Australia, Fourth Edition. Sydney: New Holland Publishers. 522 pp. .

Cyrtodactylus
Reptiles described in 1985
Taxa named by Richard Walter Wells
Taxa named by Cliff Ross Wellington
Geckos of Australia